Petro-Slavyanka is a municipal settlement in Kolpinsky District of the federal city of St. Petersburg, Russia. Population: 

It consists mostly of single-family houses. It is a place to have a dacha and many people live permanently as well.

It is on the same rail line that goes from St. Petersburg to Kolpino. The rail stop name is Slavyanka. The Slavyanka River also runs through it.

References

Municipal settlements under jurisdiction of Saint Petersburg
Kolpinsky District